Boughalboune (Arabic: بوغلبون) is a town in Skikda Province, Algeria.
The town is on the N3 highway to Skikda and sits on the bank of a tributary of the Oued Ensa River. The topography of the town is mountainous.

Climate
The summer and winter seasons are well defined.  Rains are less important in summer than they are in winter.  According to the Köppen-Geiger classification, the climate is of the Csa type.  The average temperature at El Harrouch is 17.4 ° C (63.32°F).  It falls on average 704 mm (27.7 in) of rain per year.

The driest month is July with only 5 mm (0.19 in).  With an average of 126 mm (4.9 in), January recorded the highest precipitation.  With an average temperature of 26.0 ° C (78°F), the month of August is the warmest of the year.  With an average temperature of 10.0 ° C (50°F), the month of January is the coldest of the year.

References

Populated places in Skikda Province